Isaac Osa's Schmidt (born 7 December 1999) is a Swiss professional footballer who plays as a winger for Swiss Super League club St. Gallen.

Club career

Lausanne-Sport 
On 14 June 2019, Schmidt signed his first professional contract with Lausanne-Sport. He made his professional debut in a 1–0 Swiss Super League loss to St. Gallen on 13 December 2020.

St. Gallen 
In June 2021, Schmidt signed a two-year contract with fellow Swiss Super League club St. Gallen.

International career
Schmidt was born in Switzerland to a Swiss German father and Nigerian mother. He is a youth international for Switzerland, having played for the Switzerland U19s in 2019.

References

External links
 
 SFL Profile

1999 births
Living people
Sportspeople from Lausanne
Swiss men's footballers
Switzerland youth international footballers
Swiss people of Nigerian descent
FC Lausanne-Sport players
FC St. Gallen players
Swiss Super League players
Association football wingers